, provisional designation: , is a sub-kilometer asteroid on an eccentric orbit, classified as near-Earth object and potentially hazardous asteroid of the Apollo group, approximately  in diameter. It was first observed on 20 December 2017, by astronomers with the Mount Lemmon Survey at Mount Lemmon Observatory near Tucson, Arizona, in the United States. On 29 January 2018, it passed Earth at 125 lunar distances.

Orbit and classification 

 is a member of the Apollo asteroids, which cross the orbit of Earth. Apollo's are the largest group of near-Earth objects with nearly 10 thousand known objects.

It orbits the Sun at a distance of 0.88–1.77 AU once every 18 months (558 days; semi-major axis of 1.33 AU). Its orbit has an eccentricity of 0.33 and an inclination of 21° with respect to the ecliptic.

Risk assessment 

The 9 January 2018 solution with a 15-day observation arc was listed at Torino scale 1 with a 1:21,000 chance of impacting Earth on 30 June 2047. By 9 January 2018, the geocentric 30 June 2047 uncertainty region had shrunk to ±50 million km. With a longer 20 day observation arc, it dropped to Torino scale 0 and had a 1:670,000 chance of impacting Earth on 30 June 2047. On 18 January 2018 it was removed from the Sentry Risk Table. The 3-sigma uncertainty in the 2047 close approach distance is about ±13 million km.

Numbering and naming 

This minor planet was numbered by the Minor Planet Center on 10 August 2021, receiving the number  in the minor planet catalog. , it has not been named.

See also
 List of asteroid close approaches to Earth in 2018

References

External links 
 MPEC 2017-Y79 : 2017 YZ1, Minor Planet Electronic Circular
 CNEOS – Center for Near Earth Object Studies, NASA
 List Of Apollo Minor Planets (by designation), Minor Planet Center
 List of the Potentially Hazardous Asteroids (PHAs), Minor Planet Center
 Case Study of 2017 YZ1: Long-term Impact Monitoring and IAWN , IWAN
 Asteroid 2017 YZ1 , at Asteroidsnear.com
 
 
 

585310
585310
585310
Near-Earth objects in 2018
20171220